The 2000 Grand Prix of Las Vegas presented by enjoythedrive.com was the eleventh round of the 2000 American Le Mans Series season.  It took place at Las Vegas Motor Speedway, Nevada, on October 29, 2000.

Official results
Class winners in bold.

Statistics
 Pole Position - #77 Audi Sport North America - 1:06.628
 Fastest Lap - #77 Audi Sport North America - 1:08.273
 Distance - 467.112 km
 Average Speed - 169.762 km/h

External links
  
 World Sports Racing Prototypes - Race Results

L
Grand Prix of Las Vegas
Grand Prix